João Felipe Antunes (born 11 March 1992) is a Brazilian former footballer who played as a right defender. In 2013 he went with fellow Brazilian player, Marquinhos Carioca to play in Romania for Liga I club Oțelul Galați.

References

1992 births
Living people
Brazilian footballers
Association football defenders
Liga I players
CR Flamengo footballers
ASC Oțelul Galați players
Esporte Clube Flamengo players
Maringá Futebol Clube players
Sociedade Esportiva Tiradentes players
Interporto Futebol Clube players
Brazilian expatriate footballers
Expatriate footballers in Romania
Brazilian expatriate sportspeople in Romania
Footballers from Porto Alegre